Earl Roger Sayers (born July 20, 1936) is an American academic. He served as president of University of Alabama from 1988 to 1996. Sayers attended the University of Illinois (B.S.) and Cornell University (M.S., PhD), in agronomy.

References

Presidents of the University of Alabama
1936 births
Living people
Cornell University College of Agriculture and Life Sciences alumni
People from Sterling, Illinois
University of Illinois alumni